Cairo Metro Line 3 is a main line of the Cairo Metro mass transit system in Greater Cairo, Egypt.

Currently, the line connects Kit Kai in west-central Cairo with Al Salam bus stop at a station named Adly Mansour metro station. The line
crosses the River Nile twice at the western branch between Kit Kat and Zamalek and the eastern branch between Zamalek and downtown Cairo. The line will eventually extend from the northwest of the Greater Cairo area at Imbaba to the northeast serving Cairo International Airport. The project includes a main workshop adjacent to the western terminal of the line and a light repair workshop at the middle of the line at Abbassia station. The line will use trains manufactured in Japan by Kinki Sharyo Co. and Toshiba Corp.

Caire Metro Line 3 is the only metro line in Cairo managed by a private operator-maintainer, namely RATP Dev within the framework of a 15-year contract signed in 2020 and in execution since June 2021.

Construction
Construction began in 2006, with the first section opening on February 21, 2012. The line is planned to consist of 39 stations, 26 tunnel stations, 11 elevated stations and 2 at-grade stations. The whole line (except for the Heliopolis Square-Cairo International Airport branch) is set to be completed by November 2022.

Line No. 3 was first started with the Attaba to Abbasia section, the "first phase", followed by the second phase, from Abbasia to Heliopolis, which are the two most urgent sections with respect to transportation needs.
The design of phase 1 needed to take into consideration the safe crossing of two major underground structures; namely, the line 2 bored tunnel at Attaba, and the wastewater spine tunnel north of Attaba. It was also planned that some of the underground stations would be used as extensive commercial centres. These stations will be constructed by the cut-and-cover method and the rolling stock will be fed by power through a third rail. The line has trains supplied by a joint venture of Kinki Sharyo and Toshiba and a contactless fare collection system and integrated supervision and communication system supplied by the Thales Group.
France provided a 280 million dollar loan for the second phase of the project to French companies involved in the project.

Operational
Phase 1 was completed on 21 February 2012. It runs from Attaba Station to Abbassia Station. This first phase includes five underground stations (Attaba, Bab El Shaaria, El Geish, Abdou Pasha and Abbassia) and serves the eastern part of Cairo from the city centre. 3,500 people, including 85 expatriate staff, worked on this project, which took 51 months to complete. The project was built by a consortium, led by VINCI Construction Grands Projets, comprising Bouygues Travaux Publics, Orascom and Arab Contractors. The work was delayed in September 2009, after a landslide hit the construction site on Al-Gueich Street. The phase 1 civil engineering contract covered construction of a  tunnel section and five stations. VINCI subsidiary ETF-Eurovia Travaux Ferroviaires led the consortium responsible for the track works. In 2012 it was thought to eventually transport between 250,000 and 300,000 passengers per day.

Phase 2 was set to be completed in October 2013, but was pushed back, and was opened on 7 May 2014. The construction was led by consortium with VINCI, Bouygues Travaux Publics, Orascom and Arab Contractors. It is a  tunnel. Construction work on phase 2 began in mid-2009. It runs from Abbassiya Stationto Al Ahram Station in Heliopolis, with five stations, Fair Zone, Cairo Stadium, Koleyet El Banat, Al Ahram and Haroun.

Phase 4-1 was the first stage of the final phase in Line 3 which started at 2015 with a plan for it to continue where it originally left off on the eastern side of the line completing its path towards El-Nozha. It starts from Haroun Street and passes through Heliopolis Square and ends at Ain Shams District. It has four tunnel stations: Haroun, Heliopolis Square, Alf Masken and El-Shams Club. Haroun El-Rashid, El-Shams Club and Alf Maskan stations opened on June 15, 2019, in time for the 2019 Africa Cup of Nations. Heliopolis Square station opened on 20 October 2019.

Phase 4-2 starts from El-Nozha passing through Qobaa on Gesr Al-Suez Street then towards Hikestep district and ends at Adly Mansour Station in El-Salam City (near El-Asher Bus Stop). It has six elevated stations. This stage has been completed and was opened to the public by the president on 16 August 2020.

Phase 3-1 was set to begin in 2011, led by a consortium with Orascom and Arab Contractors as the main contractors for the project; this phase will connect Attaba Station with the already existing Gamal Abdel Nasser Station through 26 July Street, it will then continue on its way onto northern Maspero (new station) and run under both branches of the Nile passing through Zamalek island at Safaa Hegazy Station and ending at Kit Kat Station under the Kit Kat Square. It was delayed due to the uprising in Egypt. Construction of the western branch of Line 3 started in September 2017, and it opened on October 10, 2022.

Under construction
Phase 3-2 will be starting from Kit Kat Station heading towards Sudan Street (new station) then towards Imbaba to the cross point of 6 October West Wing highway (under construction) and Alexandria freight railway then ends at Rod Al-Farag Corridor Station and will have 6 new stations.

Phase 3-3 will be starting from Kit Kat Station heading towards Al Tawfikiya (new station) passing through Mohandessin (Wadi Al-Nile Station, Gamaet Al-Dowal Station) then heading to Bulak Al-Dakror Station to the Cairo University Station of Line 2 where Line 2 and Line 3 will be connected to each other. This stage is set for a completion date of November 2022.

Phase 4-3 will start from Heliopolis Square Station passing through Al-Hegaz Square and Military Academy area to Sheraton District then ends at Cairo International Airport. It will have five tunnel stations. Construction has yet to start for this stage and it doesn't have a completion date as of yet.

Connections

To other Metro lines
Line 3 connects to Line 2 at Attaba Station and with Line 1 at Nasser Station.

To other forms of transit
Cairo metro Line 3 riders can access Egyptian National Railways long-haul and short-haul domestic passenger service via transfer to Line 2 and debarkation at Shohadaa Station near Ramses Station. Cairo Transport Authority buses and private microbus services are also nearby.

Access to Cairo International Airport is planned upon completion of Phase 4-3 (no completion date yet).

The Cairo LRT is a commuter rail line linking the New Administrative Capital with Cairo. The line starts at Adly Mansour Station at Al Salam City providing a transfer to the Cairo Metro Line 3, and splits into two branches at Badr station. The northern branch runs parallel to the Cairo Ring Road, reaching 10th of Ramadan City. The southern branch connects to the New Administrative Capital. Intermediate cities along the train's route include Obour, El Shorouk, and Future City.

Line 3 is also slated to connect to both Monorail projects in the Greater Cairo Area. The New Administrative Capital Monorail will meet Line 3 at Stadium station, which will serve as the monorail's terminus. The 6th of October City Monorail will eventually connect to Line 3 in Nile Valley station, part of the line's western expansion plans.

Criticism

When construction began, residents of the historic island of Zamalek were concerned that the location of the station was not opportune. A complaint was filed to the European Investment Bank, which helped finance the project, which dismissed the complaint. The residents fears were nevertheless confirmed on 26 July 2020, when an apartment building above one of the construction sites subsided and was evacuated. The fence of the adjoining Bahraini embassy also showed signs of damage.

See also
List of Cairo Metro stations

External links
Mobility Cairo - Network Maps and Line 3 Maps

References
 Line 3 on Google Maps

Cairo Metro
Railway lines opened in 2012